The town of Tairua is on the east coast of the Coromandel Peninsula in the North Island of New Zealand. It lies at the mouth of the Tairua River on its north bank and on the small Paku Peninsula. Tairua is a Māori name which translates literally as tai: tides, rua: two.

Directly opposite Tairua on the south bank of the river's estuary is the smaller settlement of Pauanui. The two settlements are 30 kilometres east of Thames although the town has closer connections with the sea side resort town Whangamatā. Several islands lie off the mouth of the river, notably Slipper Island to the southeast and the Aldermen Islands 20 kilometres to the east. Mount Paku is an extinct volcano that lies by Tairua Harbour. It was thought to have formed the Alderman Islands.

History and features 
The earliest occupation of the area was once thought to have been by early Polynesian explorers based on the discovery of a pearl-shell (not native to New Zealand) lure shank found here and originally carbon-dated to the 11th century. Subsequent reassessment of the archaeological site has resulted in dates in the 14th century.

Early European settlers to the area, in the late 19th century, were primarily drawn by timber stocks (predominantly kauri) and gold prospecting.

From the late 1960s Tairua has become a holiday destination, with major activities including game fishing, scuba diving, and surfing.

Radio Tairua is an independent radio station on frequency 88.3FM, which has broadcast to the area since May 2007.

The local Oturu Marae is located in Tairua. It is a tribal meeting ground for Ngāti Rautao and includes the Ngatau Wiwi meeting house.

Demographics

Tairua had a population of 1,479 at the 2018 New Zealand census, an increase of 252 people (20.5%) since the 2013 census, and an increase of 213 people (16.8%) since the 2006 census. There were 636 households, comprising 747 males and 732 females, giving a sex ratio of 1.02 males per female. The median age was 56.9 years (compared with 37.4 years nationally), with 213 people (14.4%) aged under 15 years, 123 (8.3%) aged 15 to 29, 624 (42.2%) aged 30 to 64, and 516 (34.9%) aged 65 or older.

Ethnicities were 89.9% European/Pākehā, 11.6% Māori, 2.2% Pacific peoples, 4.7% Asian, and 2.0% other ethnicities. People may identify with more than one ethnicity.

The percentage of people born overseas was 22.3, compared with 27.1% nationally.

Although some people chose not to answer the census's question about religious affiliation, 52.7% had no religion, 33.7% were Christian, 0.8% had Māori religious beliefs, 1.0% were Hindu, 0.2% were Muslim, 1.0% were Buddhist and 2.0% had other religions.

Of those at least 15 years old, 225 (17.8%) people had a bachelor's or higher degree, and 240 (19.0%) people had no formal qualifications. The median income was $25,400, compared with $31,800 nationally. 129 people (10.2%) earned over $70,000 compared to 17.2% nationally. The employment status of those at least 15 was that 465 (36.7%) people were employed full-time, 195 (15.4%) were part-time, and 27 (2.1%) were unemployed.

Climate

Tairua features an extremely mild oceanic climate (Köppen: Cfb) with no month having an average temperature above 20 °C or below 10 °C. As a result of this, temperatures above 30 °C or below 0 °C are almost unheard of with the town being a popular holiday location because of its mild weather, beautiful beaches and rugged hills and mountains. These surrounding hills and mountains also cause the city to see significant rainfall throughout the year, especially in winter which can often lead to flooding and slips which isolate the community (almost annually) for a day or two at a time. This high rainfall also leads to lush temperate rainforest vegetation surrounding the city.

Education

Central Kids Tairua Kindergarten provides early childhood education for tamariki aged 2–5 years.

Notes

External links

Radio Tairua 88.3FM
Tairua.net

Thames-Coromandel District
Populated places in Waikato